Far Eastern University (Filipino: Pamantasan ng Malayong Silanganan), also referred to by its acronym FEU, is a private non-sectarian university in Manila, Philippines. Created by the merger of Far Eastern College and the Institute of Accounts, Business and Finance, FEU became a university in 1934 under the guidance of its first president, Nicanor Reyes Sr. 
 

The first accountancy school for Filipinos, the university, through the years, has expanded its course offerings to the arts and sciences, architecture, fine arts, education, engineering, computer studies, graduate studies, tourism and hotel management, law, nursing, and medicine. FEU has seven campuses located in Metro Manila, Cavite and Rizal. It offers programs from elementary, secondary, tertiary, to graduate school.

FEU Manila comprises several Institutes that offer specific programs. The accountancy program, along with its other undergraduate programs, have received the highest Level IV accreditation from the Philippine Association of Colleges and Universities Commission on Accreditation (PACUCOA). The Commission on Higher Education (CHED) has also granted it as a Center of Development in Business Administration and a Center of Excellence for Teacher Education.

Since its establishment in 1928, FEU has produced national artists, business tycoons, ambassadors, justices of the Supreme Court and other judicial bodies, technocrats in private and government sectors, finance wizards, acclaimed physicians, nurses, educators, theater and media luminaries and so many others in different fields of expertise.

History

Pre-war 
The University was founded in November 1933 when the Far Eastern College and the Institute of Accounts, Business, and Finance (IABF) merged. Far Eastern College, founded in 1919 by Vicente K. Fabella (the first Filipino CPA), Nicanor Maronilla-Seva, Francisco Africa, Pedro Cortez, and Salvador Unson, had been a liberal arts college in Quiapo; while the IABF had been established (originally under the name Institute of Accountancy) by Francisco Dalupan Sr. and Nicanor Reyes Sr., then head of the Department of Economics at the University of the Philippines, with a number of other prominent educators in 1928. 

The IABF had been originally predominately used by night students, and the new University, which was supported by the tuition provided by its students rather than government grants, soon demonstrated that a private university was financially sustainable in the Philippines.

In the early 1930s, FEU was housed in a converted tobacco factory (La Oriente Fabrica de Tabacos y Compania; boundary of Quiapo and Sampaloc district lots) already present on the  property lot owned by Sulucan Hill subdivision. Due to the widening of the street that became Quezon Blvd., the original building designed and built by Architect Pablo Antonio Sr., National Artist for Architecture, was demolished and had to be rebuilt on a bigger scale on what is the present campus of FEU.

In 1934, the Institute of Law was founded. Two years later, the Institute of Technology was founded, with Fransisco Santana its first dean. In April 1938, the FEU Junior College was opened in Lingayen, Pangasinan.

Dr. Nicanor Reyes Sr., as the founding president of the University, spent his early years establishing several of its institutes, including those of Law and Technology. Dr. Reyes Sr. commissioned Architect Pablo S. Antonio Sr. to construct the main building for the University. In 1939, the Nicanor B. Reyes Sr. Hall, which would later house the main library at third level and Institute of Accounts, Business and Finance, opened. Two other buildings by Antonio, the Girls’ High School Building and Boys High School Building, followed in 1940 and 1941, by which year FEU had approximately 10,000 registered students, with an international student population of 400. Former Philippine President Manuel L. Quezon hailed and called FEU "the best non-sectarian institution in the country."

In 1941, FEU also had the first ROTC quartermaster and ROTC finance units in the Philippines. During the American colonial period, The FEU ROTC was notable for having the first Coastal Artillery unit in the Philippines. During World War II, FEU cadets fought in Bataan with the Second Infantry Division. FEU constituted the majority of cadets who received armor training. These cadets were trained to operate the American M5 light tank. At the time that the FEU's coast artillery unit was formed, the Philippine Army's Coast Artillery was equipped with the Canon de 155 mm GPF. During the Philippine–American War, the Philippine coast artillery had one 150mm Ordóñez guns. It is said that of all the Philippine colleges whose students and alumni volunteered for military service at the outbreak of the Pacific War in 1941, FEU men formed the greatest number.

During the war 
In 1942, University closed and the campus was used as a multi-functional facility by the Imperial Japanese Army Transportation Corps. It was later used as the Prisoner of War Bureau for the Japanese Army.

The main building sustained bullet damage while the other three buildings (Girls High, Boys High, and the old Technology Building) were left intact. During the Battle of Manila in 1945, Dr. Reyes Sr. was killed  by the Japanese, and Hermengildo B. Reyes was appointed the second president of the University after it reopened in 1945.

Post-war 
In October 1945, FEU reopened despite the use of most of its facilities by the American forces until their departure in May 1946. The post-liberation years saw the renaissance of FEU with its massive expansion of facilities aimed at meeting the demands of modern and relevant education in the country and the increasing student population. FEU was once named as the “Largest University in Asia”, in the early 1950s when its enrollment passed near 50,000 students.

Thereafter, FEU continued to expand, with the opening of the Science Building and the establishment of the Institute of Medicine and the School of Nursing. In 1955, the FEU Hospital was inaugurated. Humanities were introduced in 1959, and in 1970 the Institute of Architecture and Fine Arts opened. Also in 1970, the for-profit status of the Institute of Medicine, School of Medical Technology, FEU Hospital and the Student Health Service Clinic was altered, when these were converted into the Far Eastern University – Nicanor Reyes Medical Foundation, a non-stock, non-profit educational foundation.

In 1989, Nicanor Reyes Jr. introduced substantial revitalization to FEU that took place over a number of years, with renovation and modernization of facilities and grounds and upgrading of the university's educational standard. This resulted in the accreditation of the Institute of Arts and Sciences, the Institute of Education, and the Institute of Accounts, Business and Finance, and, in the mid-1990s, the deregulation of the university by the Commission on Higher Education. The auditorium was upgraded to accommodate modern stage productions and the new twice-monthly presentations by local and international artists established by the President's Committee on Culture. The university also prioritized publication, launching a number of scholarly journals, and began networking with other institutions nationally and abroad.

In 1996, after careful study of the technology program, the administration decided to phase it out in favor of a computer technology program forged with the East Asia Computer Center, Inc., established earlier in 1992, which offered degrees in computer science and certificate courses. FEU would then buy out its stocks in 2003 and establish the FEU East Asia College (FEU-EAC).

In 2010, FEU established the Institute of Tourism and Hotel Management and the FEU Makati campus, which started its operations by June of the same year. FEU Makati offer master's degree program in Business Administration and Baccalaureate programs in Accountancy, Accounting Technology, Information Technology and Business Administration.

In 2022, the Institute of Health Sciences and Nursing (IHSN) was established. Under the said institute would be health allied programs in the university, with the existing Nursing program merged with Medical Technology. Proposed new programs are Pharmacy, Nutrition and Dietetics, set to be introduced by the following year.

Corporate 
The Far Eastern University, Incorporated is a domestic non-sectarian educational institution founded in June 1928 and was registered and incorporated with the Philippine Securities and Exchange Commission on October 27, 1933. On October 27, 1983, the university extended its corporate life to another 50 years. The university became a listed corporation in the PSE on July 11, 1986.

The company operates through three segments: education, real estate and investment activities. Its geographical segments include Manila, Makati and Cavite.

The university's major subsidiaries include: Far Eastern College – Silang, Inc. (FECSI), East Asia Computer Center, Inc. (EACCI), Fern Realty Corporation (FRC), FEU Alabang, Inc. and FEU High School, Inc. Similar to the university, FECSI, EACCI, FEU Alabang, Inc. and FEU High School, Inc. were established to operate as educational institutions offering general courses of study. In April 2016, FEU entered into a share purchase agreement to acquire an initial 80% of Roosevelt College, Inc.

In 2019, FEU has entered into a joint venture with the Technological Institute of the Philippines to launch Edustria, a senior high school in Batangas.

University emblems

The university seal

The FEU Coat of Arms depicts a Sarimanok holding a kalasag. Inside the kalasag is an 8 pointed star with a bamboo scroll under it, inscribed with the baybayin letters “KKK”. Meanwhile, the university seal has the Coat of Arms housed inside a green ellipse with gold outline, surrounded with the university's name in baybayin-inspired font and the IABF's founding year at the bottom.

 The logo and font were designed by Galo Ocampo, the Father of Philippine Heraldry.
 FEU is one of the first universities in the country to be established by a Filipino. Thus, in 1961, the university wanted to showcase the Sarimanok-inspired coat of arms, as proposed by former Institute of Arts and Sciences Dean Alejandro Roces; for it projects the nationalistic spirit upon which the university was founded. It also serves as the link between the past and present.
 The "KKK" inscription means Katotohanan (Truth), Kagandahan (Beauty), and Kabutihan (Goodness).

The university colors

Green and Gold are the university's official colors. Green is for hope, representing Rizal's "Fair hope of the Fatherland" while Gold represents the golden opportunity for the university to serve the youth and her alumni to serve the country.The university mascot

The tamaraw is the athletic mascot of the University and nickname of every FEU student (Tams). Known scientifically as “Bubalus mindorensis”, it is a rare animal found only in the island of Mindoro. Symbolically enough, the tamaraw is one of the most intelligent, pugnacious and aggressive of our animal species just as the university is known for its advanced, progressive policy in contemporary education.

The university mace

The mace is the symbol of the Office of the University President. It is used on every formal event.

Manila Campus
FEU's campus is noted for a number of historical Art Deco buildings preserved from the first half of the 20th century. Among the buildings on FEU's campus complex, five by the late Ar. Pablo S. Antonio Sr., garnered recognition in 2005 from the United Nations Educational, Scientific and Cultural Organization (UNESCO), who bestowed the Asia Pacific Heritage Award for Cultural Heritage on the university for "the outstanding preservation of its Art Deco structures." The buildings include the Nicanor B. Reyes Sr. Hall, the Admissions Building, the Architecture and Fine Arts Building, the Administration Building, and the Science Building. The Cultural Center of the Philippines also recognized the historical legacy of the buildings with a marker. Other historical buildings on the campus include the 1950s FEU Chapel and the Arts Building, which represent the International Style.

The university maintains various facilities, such as an electronic library, various types of laboratories, an auditorium, audio-visual and multimedia rooms, technology-based gate security and enrollment system, and gymnasiums.

Due to FEU's mission to preserve and care for the environment, the university has a green and eco-friendly campus landscape and is famously called as the "Oasis of the University Belt".

History 
During the 1930s, there was a heavy influence of American culture especially in the field of technology and construction that was reflected in the lives of the Filipinos. Concrete and steel were used by the Americans and was found to be the suitable materials for the tropical environment. These were materialized by Arch. Pablo S. Antonio Sr. in creating the FEU campus buildings that reflected both the university's and the country's vision and showed his personal transition from Art Deco to the International Style. The buildings were constructed between the years 1939 to 1950.

Heritage Buildings of FEU Manila Campus

Nicanor B. Reyes Sr. Hall
The Nicanor B. Reyes Sr. Hall, named after the founder of the FEU, is a long, low-rise U-shaped building facing Quezon Boulevard beside the Alfredo Reyes Hall. The building was constructed in 1939 by National Artist Arch. Pablo Antonio. The distinct character of the massive façade are the sets of protruded vertical volumes located on both ends of the structure.

Attention to details is another design focus of the architecture of Pablo S. Antonio Sr. The heavy influence of Art Deco in his architectural style is seen even in transitional elements like the stairs. The outdoor stairs that joins the walkway at the second floor has layers of thin concrete slabs that swirl in waves above the rigid geometry of the handrail.

The physical envelope of the building is one of the examples of classic Philippine Art Deco emphasizing the play on geometric forms.

Administration Building
The FEU Administration Building was also designed by Arch. Antonio Sr. a decade after the Nicanor B. Reyes Sr. Hall. It is located at the opposite end of the campus quadrangle that features a façade with geometric architectural details, horizontal windows, and a balcony that extends into a viewing deck at the second floor to observe the activities in the quadrangle. The Administration lobby has floor tiles made of Carrara Marble, the same material used by Michelangelo in his mother and child sculpture La Pieta and also used in New York's Grand Central Station.

It houses the works of many known Filipino artists, most of them in the Art Deco era. One work is a mural done by Antonio Gonzales Dumlao, which conveys the university's mission; while Italian sculptor Francesco Ricardo Monti did a bas-relief on the lobby depicting the history of the Philippines. The Art Deco-inspired FEU Auditorium can be found inside the Administration Building. The FEU Auditorium is the Administration Building's centerpiece. It houses 1040 seats and occupies three floors of the four story building.

Art Deco features abound in the design of the Auditorium and include the gradual curves, the ribbed piers and geometric volumes and patterns. Above the orchestra section are star or diamond like patterns which also serve as lighting fixtures. Above the balcony are triangles which also serve as air conditioning ducts. These, together with the green and gold theme, and the subtle lettering of "FEU" under the boxes were all combined in a regal manner. The interior was restored in 2002-2003 and was also infused with new lighting, sound and video equipment. It was the only post-war venue with air-conditioning and a revolving stage. It used to be the Cultural Center of the Philippines in the 1950s given that all the foremost Filipino and foreign performers of the time performed there.

Admissions Building
Inaugurated in 1940, the Admissions Building is the mirror image of the Architecture & Fine Arts Building. The building was initially used by the Girls' High School, and in 1983, became home to the Institute of Medicine. In the early 2000s, served as the FEU-East Asia College (FEU-EAC) Main Building. In 2015, the building has been renovated and returned to FEU Manila, renamed as the Main Building. Today, the building hosts the Office of the University Registrar, the Admissions and Financial Assistance Office, Alumni Relations Office, various computer laboratories, and education technology offices.

Architecture and Fine Arts Building
The building is one of the twin edifices flanking the Administration Building. It is the third building designed by Arch. Antonio Sr., also in the Art Deco Style. Constructed in 1941, it used to house the Boys' High School, which was originally in the basic education program of the university. It also used to house the Law and Nursing programs before being handed to the Institute of Architecture and Fine Arts.

Science Building
The seven-storey building erected in 1950 was the last designed building by Arch. Antonio Sr. in what is considered a transition of style between Art Deco and the post World War 2 International Style. In 1990, an earthquake caused structural damages to the building making it necessary to demolish the top two floors. By the late 2013, a sixth floor was added. The building now houses the Departments of Medical Technology, Psychology, Biology and Mathematics.

Accounts, Business and Finance Building 
Formerly known as the expansion of Nursing Building in the early 1960s, the 7-storey building was formerly known as the Education Building, before the building was renamed as the Accounts, Business and Finance Building in 2017, as the building is currently occupied by the Institute of Accounts, Business and Finance.

Alfredo Reyes Hall 
Named after the founder's son, the Alfredo Reyes Hall is a 6-storey building, adjacent to the Nicanor Reyes Hall. The building houses the Institute of Tourism and Hotel Management and features a mock hotel, cooking laboratories, a basketball court with maple wood flooring, which was the first of its kind in the country, and a student operated café, Cafe Alfredo, which was established in 2014.

Arts Building 
Designed by Felipe Mendoza, the Arts and Sciences Building (shortened to simply Arts Building) was erected within the 1960s and was originally an 8-storey building, before being downgraded to 6-storeys due to structural damage in the aftermath of the August 1968 Luzon earthquake. The Arts Building houses the Departments of Communication, Political Science, Interdisciplinary & International Studies, Language and Literature. The building features a gym on the topmost floor and the University Conference Center on the ground floor. At present, the building is undergoing retrofitting.

Education Building 
Formerly known as the FEU-EAC Annex Building, the seven-storey building was completed in 2001, as part of the FEU-EAC expansion project. The building was also based on the Nicanor Reyes Hall, as the building features two pillars inspired from the former's pillars, and an arched rooftop, surrounded by green-colored glass. The building currently houses the Institute of Education.

Engineering Building 
The nine-storey building stands on the site of the former FEU Hospital, designed by Architect Felipe Mendoza. Upon the transfer of FEU-NRMF to Fairview, Quezon City, the structure was demolished to give way for the construction of a new building, completed in 2005. The building was formerly known as the Technology Building, before being renamed as the Engineering Building in 2019. It houses the FEU Tech Innovation Center, a mini auditorium, and the FEU Center for the Arts Office.

FEUTURE Center 
The FEU Transformative University Resource Center (abbreviated as FEUTURE Center) is the newest building of the university. Located along Lerma St., the FEUTURE Center is an 8-storey building and features additional classrooms, learning facilities and parking spaces within the complex. Construction for the building began in 2018, and was initially planned to be opened within the first quarter of 2020. However, the opening of the building was delayed due to COVID-19 pandemic, and was initially completed in January 2021, before opening its doors in April 2021.

Nursing Building 
The seven-storey building was completed in the 1960s, and served as the former home of the Institute of Architecture and Fine Arts. It was turned over to the Institute of Nursing, being the reason for its current name. At present, it still houses the Institute's Virtual Integrated Nursing Education Simulation Laboratory (VINES) and is dominantly occupied by FEU High School.

FEU Auditorium 
FEU's Auditorium is designed by Pablo Antonio Sr., National Artist for Architecture, in 1949. It was regarded as the first "cultural center of the Philippines", and also, the very first fully air-conditioned auditorium in the country which can accommodate 1000 spectators. The Auditorium was home to renowned orchestras. It featured dances from Manila Ballet Academy, New York City Center Ballet, and Martha Graham – an American dancer and one of the twentieth century revolutionary artists. It also became the venue of major theatrical productions like Bastien and Bastienne – created by two National Artists, Nick Joaquin (on words) and Cesar Legaspi (on scenic designs). In addition, it was in FEU where Sarah Joaquin–actress, writer, director, and former Head of the Drama Department–showcased her talents through presentation of classic and contemporary plays. To this date, the Auditorium upholds this legacy by accommodating more notable performances from local and international names.

FEU Chapel 
Another masterpiece is within campus is the Student Council Association (SCA) Chapel, which was also designed by Architect Felipe Mendoza. Inaugurated on December 8, 1957, the SCA Chapel is where catholic activities of faculty, personnel, and students are held. Its interior features a mural by Carlos “Botong” Francisco, National Artist for Visual Arts. His painting 14 Stations of the Cross encompasses 260 degrees of one's visual range. The SCA Chapel's façade is the richly colored tile mosaic of Our Lady of Fatima by Vicente Manansala, also a National Artist who developed the transparent cubism technique apparent in this piece of art.

Nicanor B. Reyes Sr. Memorial Square 
In the middle of the campus rests this landmark and favorite backdrop for picture-taking in the campus. Erected in commemoration of the University's 40th anniversary, it consists of a 65-foot flagpole on a platform surrounded on all sides with brass sculpture, also done by Manansala, which interprets the late founder's philosophy of education. It represents the professional disciplines offered by the university.

FEU Library 
Located on the second and third floors of the Nicanor Reyes Hall, the Library has a collection of books that falls under Circulation, Reference, Filipiniana, and Periodical sections. These can easily be accessed using an Online Public Access Catalog (OPAC), its online database of all its print and multi-media resources. The Electronic Library is also available to provide members of the academic community highly effective learning experiences and services through the web and internet technologies as an extension of the services of the conventional library.

The Philippine Association of Academic Research Librarians, Inc. (PAARL) honored the library with the Outstanding Academic/Research Library Award during the PAARL 2012 Awards. The FEU library was recognized for its outstanding contribution to academic and research librarianship and library development along with leadership in regional library management, education and training, information and documentation services.

Academics 
Far Eastern University offers 24 undergraduate programs, 17 graduate degree programs, and a law school through its seven institutes, while the Institute of Technology offers 9 undergraduate programs leading to engineering and computer studies. The university offers secondary, post-secondary, and certification courses as well. Since 2020, FEU Manila holds extension programs in its Cavite campus

The university runs on a semestral academic system. An academic year starts in the second week of August and ends in May. The university is supervised by the Board of Trustees, which is made up of academic practitioners and specialists from various disciplines.

Students who wish to study in the university must pass the College Entrance Exam (FEUCAT). However, due to the COVID-19 global pandemic, since SY 2020–2021, the FEUCAT is replaced by the FEU Student Placement for Admission to College Education (SPACE), wherein academic performance in Grades 11 and 12 are the basis for admissions.

Grading system 
An FEU student's final grade for a course generally comes in the form of a letter, which is a summary of their performance in the formative and summative assessments. A is given a value of 4, B+ 3.5, B 3, C+ 2.5, C 2, D+ 1.5, D 1, and F 0. The passing mark for all university courses regardless of program is 50%.

Scholarship grants 
FEU funds an average of over 3,500 scholars every year, providing about 11% of the total student population. Scholarships are granted to academically qualified students, financially challenged yet deserving individuals, and university representatives in different fields of service and interests.

Recognition and accreditation 
Conferred the Autonomous University status by Commission on Higher Education (CHED), FEU Manila currently meets the highest regulatory standards set for Philippine HEIs. CHED has designated FEU's Teacher Education Program and Bachelor of Science in Business Administration as Center of Excellence and Center of Development, respectively.

FEU Manila has twenty-one accredited programs. In addition, eight of the undergraduate programs have level 4 – the highest – accreditation from the Philippine Association of Colleges and Universities Commission on Accreditation (PACUCOA), while the rest are on their way to obtaining ever higher accreditation levels.

FEU Manila's international recognitions include being an associate member of the ASEAN University Network – Quality Assurance (AUN-QA), one of less than ten Philippine HEIs with the distinction; a member of the Association to Advance Collegiate Schools of Business (AACSB) for its BS Accountancy, BS Business Administration, and Master of Business Administration programs; and an associate member of the International Centre of Excellence in Tourism and Hospitality Management (THE-ICE) for its BS Tourism Management and BS Hotel and Restaurant Management programs. The Architecture, Accountancy, Applied Mathematics, Biology, Business Administration, Communication, Elementary Education, International Studies, Medical Technology, Nursing, Psychology, and Secondary Education programs are certified by the ASEAN University Network - Quality Assurance (AUN-QA). ITHM's BS Tourism Management program is also accredited by the Asia-Pacific Institute for Events Management (APIEM) as a Center of Excellence. FEU was the only Philippine school included in the World Universities with Real Impact (WURI) Ranking for 2020, placing 91st in the Global Top 100 Innovative Universities. It also placed 19th on Ethical Value, according to the WURI ranking system.

International 

The university received an ISO 9000:2008 for Quality Management and became one of the pilot universities in assessment by IQUAME. 
Member of the International Association of Universities (IAU)  
Associate Status with the International Centre of Excellence in Tourism and Hospitality Education
Member of the Pacific Asia Travel Association (Philippine Chapter)
Member of the Association to Advance Collegiate Schools of Business
Associate Member of the ASEAN University Network Quality Assurance
Center for Excellence by the Asia Pacific Institute for Events Management International
 Accredited by the Association of Chartered Certified Accountants

Local

In 2012, Far Eastern University was granted Autonomous Status by the Commission on Higher Education (CHED). FEU has twenty-one accredited programs by the Philippine Association of Colleges and Universities Commission on Accreditation (PACUCOA) and Philippine Accrediting Association of Schools, Colleges and Universities (PAASCU).

 PACUCOA Level IV Accredited programs: Accountancy, Applied Mathematics with Information Technology, Biology, Business Administration, Communication, Elementary Education, Secondary Education, Psychology
 PACUCOA Level III Accredited programs: Language and Literature Studies, Political Science, Doctor of Education, Master of Arts in education, and Master of Arts in psychology
 PACUCOA Level II Accredited programs: Hotel and Restaurant Management, Architecture, Fine Arts, International Studies, Medical Technology
PAASCU Level III Accredited program: Bachelor of Science in Nursing
Founding member of Philippine Association of Colleges and Universities (PACU)

Research 
FEU funds research in areas such as biodiversity, urban renewal, public health, genetics, sociolinguistics, and indigenous cultures. The university, through the representation of the URC, has been an active member of the Metro Manila Health Research and Development Consortium (MMHRDC) and the University belt Consortium (U-Belt Consortium).
 FEU Public Policy Center - is a private research foundation which aims to make a substantive contribution to evidence-based policymaking through in-depth research and public discussion.
Center for Studies on the Urban Environment (SURE) - created in response to continuing degradation of the urban environment most especially in the inner cities. As its initial major project, the Center organized in November 2000 the "International Conference on Megacities in the 21st Century," It gathered speakers from Asian and Western Countries who shared their knowledge and experience in Urban renewal and development.
 FEU Center for Continuing Education - it serves as the university's arm for conducting relevant trainings and programs for non-FEU students and professionals.
FEU Innovation Center - will serve as a think-tank and incubation center for business ideas.
FEU Community Extension Services (CES)
 Center for Teaching and Learning (CTL)
 Center for Learning Enrichment & Research for Students
 Language Learning Center
 University Research Center (URC) - a university-based research and extension unit that aims to foster a culture of research in the university. The URC facilitates the production of research through funding, research capability-building, research information dissemination, linkages and publication.  
 FEU Herbarium
 FEU-DENR-WWF Tams2

Publications 
FEU publishes various Key Institutional Materials and University Publications.

 Annual Report
 President's Report
 TAMBULI - the official publication of Far Eastern University.
The FEU Advocate - the official student publication of FEU Manila, established in 1934.
Asian Journal on Perspectives in Education - is an open access, multidisciplinary, and double-blind peer-reviewed international journal. A flagship project of IE.
Asia-Pacific Journal of Communication - academic journal of IAS, department of communication. 

The Paragon - the official student publication of IAS, established in 2006.
Circle Arts and Design Magazine - the official publication of IARFA, which showcases the art projects of its students.
The Lamp - the official student publication of IN.
 Far Eastern Law Review - the official journal publication of IL.

Student life 
FEU has had long and rich history in education, culture, arts, sports and student leadership development.

Athletics 
FEU is a founding member of the two major collegiate athletic organizations in the Philippines, namely the National Collegiate Athletic Association (NCAA) and the University Athletic Association of the Philippines (UAAP).

Among the many athletes who have attended FEU are Alberto Nogar Sr, Lydia De Vega, Elma Muros, Anthony Villanueva, and Johnny Abarrientos. FEU's teams are named after the tamaraw, a buffalo with a reputation for ferocity.

Events 
Tatak Tamaraw - a week long event that welcomes freshmen to the FEU community. It also orients them on policies, support services, and the vibrant campus life.

Tam Hunt - the student organizations membership fair facilitated by the FEU Central Student Organization (FEUCSO).

Tam Rally - parade and performances by FEU Athletes and Cultural Groups in preparation for the upcoming UAAP season.

CreePIYU - an annual halloween event managed by the FEU Guides.

Pasko sa Piyu - university-wide Christmas celebration ending with the Christmas Tree lighting, which features performances from the various cultural groups.

One Concierto Piyu - a concert held on the last day of the university's foundation week.

Musica FEUROPA -  is an annual national choral competition in partnership with the European Union (EU) organized by the FEU Chorale and the FEU Center for the Arts.

Arts and culture 
Since 1990, the university has maintained the FEU Center for the Arts (formerly known as President's Committee on Culture) which programs a year-long calendar of cultural activities. The FCA also nurtures seven cultural groups namely, FEU Bamboo band, FEU Chorale, FEU Dance Company, FEU Drum and Bugle Corps, FEU Theater Guild, FEU Drummers and the FEU Guides. The FEU Guides conduct tours of FEU's UNESCO awarded campus.

FEU was the first university in the Philippines that allowed students to dress up according to their gender identity. In August 2016, the university started to relax its dress code and allowed students to dress according to one's gender. The students can enjoy all-gender restrooms, "a no-haircut policy", school attire options instead of a uniform, and a multi-faith room.

Student organizations and core groups 
There are 60 student organizations under the supervision of the Office of Student Affairs, which serves as the arms of Student Development, Guidance & Counseling, FEU Center for the Arts, Institutes, and Departments of degree programs in providing out-of-the-classroom experiences for the students to make them holistically formed. The organizations usually conduct projects during the Activity Period.

The FEU Central Student Organization is the central student government of the university, which promotes student rights and well-being and at the same time develop programs and activities that will cater the needs of the student body inside or outside the university.

Volunteerism 
The Volunteerism Services Office (VSO) collaborates with stakeholders and communities to deliver Corporate Social Responsibility programs in the field of teaching, culture, livelihood capacity building, environment, disaster response, and relief operations. The university participates in Hands on Manila's yearly Servathon, an event that helps marginalized sectors through volunteer service.

FEU Group of Schools
The FEU System is composed of six legal entities, 10 campuses, and over 40,000 students.

Notable alumni

Among its alumni are former Supreme Court Chief Justice Artemio Panganiban, business magnates Henry Sy of SM Investments, Lucio Tan of Fortune Tobacco and Philippine Air Lines, Ambassador Alfonso Yuchengco of Yuchengco Group of Companies, CEO Benjamin Punongbayan of Punongbayan & Araullo, and Ramon Ang, President of San Miguel Corporation among others.

Among the well-known international athletes are Anthony Villanueva (boxing), Felicisimo Ampon (tennis), Lydia De Vega (track and field), Johnny Abarrientos (basketball), Rachel Daquis (volleyball), and Janelle Frayna (chess).

See also 
List of colleges and universities in Metro Manila

References

External links

 
Education in Sampaloc, Manila
Universities and colleges in Manila
Universities and colleges in Makati
Research universities in the Philippines
Business schools in the Philippines
Companies based in Manila
Educational institutions established in 1928
1928 establishments in the Philippines
Art Deco architecture in the Philippines
Buildings and structures in Makati
Companies listed on the Philippine Stock Exchange
University Athletic Association of the Philippines universities